Jonas Felix Australia Levien (28 March 1840 – 24 May 1906) was an Australian politician, a member of the Victorian Legislative Assembly from 1871 to 1877 and from 1880 until his death.

Born in Williamstown to Benjamin Goldsmith Levien and Eliza Lindo (who both arrived in Victoria from England in 1839), he attended Geelong Grammar School before becoming a farmer at Drysdale. He served as a director for several companies, and his own was a major grower in the Mildura area. On 15 March 1871 he married Clara (née Levien) in Sydney, with whom he had four children. He was a Bellarine Shire Councillor from 1869 to 1975 and president from 1870 to 1872.

In April 1871 Levien was elected to the Victorian Legislative Assembly as the member for South Grant; he transferred to Barwon in 1877 but was unseated in December of that year. He served as the member for Barwon again from 1880 to 1906. Levien was Minister for Mines and Agriculture from 8 March 1883 to 18 February 1886. He died in St Kilda on 24 May 1906.

References

 

1840 births
1906 deaths
Members of the Victorian Legislative Assembly
People from Williamstown, Victoria
Australian farmers
Victoria (Australia) local councillors
Politicians from Geelong
19th-century Australian politicians
People educated at Geelong Grammar School
Victorian Ministers for Agriculture